These are the Canadian number-one country albums of 1993, per the RPM Country Albums chart.

1993
1993 record charts
1993 in Canadian music